Lucien Abbe (22 December 1883 – 22 February 1946) was a French racing cyclist. He rode in the 1921 Tour de France.

References

1883 births
1946 deaths
French male cyclists